Southampton Central Baptist Church is a Baptist church located in the Polygon area of Southampton, Hampshire. The building in which the church meets is a Grade II listed building.

References

External links
The official website of the Southampton Central Baptist Church.
Map and satellite image of the church on Google Maps

Churches in Southampton
Baptist churches in Hampshire
Southampton